The 2012 United States House of Representatives elections in Texas were held on Tuesday, November 6, 2012, to elect the 36 U.S. representatives from the state of Texas—an increase of four seats in reapportionment following the 2010 United States Census. The elections coincided with the elections of other federal and state offices, including a quadrennial presidential election and an election for the U.S. Senate. The primary election had been scheduled to be held on March 6, 2012, with a runoff election on May 22; because of problems arising from redistricting, the primary was postponed to May 29, and the run-off to July 31.

With 58% of voting age people turning out, all existing seats were held by their respective parties with one exception, the Democrats picking up the 23rd District. Of the four new seats, two were won by the Republican Party for a total of 24 seats, and two were won by the Democratic Party for a total of 12 seats.

Redistricting
In March 2011, The Texas Tribune conducted a poll of Texas "insiders" which found 54 per cent to believe three of the state's four new congressional districts would be drawn to favor the Republican Party, with one district drawn to favor the Democratic Party; while 37 per cent of those polled felt two districts would favor Republicans while two would favor Democrats. In April, Republican U.S. Representative Lamar Smith argued that the seats should be evenly split between the parties in order to reflect Texas's growing Hispanic population and abide by the Voting Rights Act. Joe Barton, also a Republican U.S. Representative, disagreed, arguing that three or four of the districts should favor Republicans.

Also in April, the Mexican American Legislative Caucus filed a lawsuit against Governor Rick Perry and the state of Texas, seeking to halt redistricting based on Census data which allegedly failed to count up to 250,000 Hispanic residents of colonias. Later in April, Democratic U.S. Representative Lloyd Doggett released a map which he alleged had been submitted by Republican members of Congress to leaders of the Texas Legislature. The map would divide Travis County between four districts, three of which would favor Republicans and one of which would favor Democrats.

In May, state representative Burt Solomons, a Republican, expressed concern that the legislature would not produce a congressional redistricting map by May 30, when it was scheduled to adjourn, and that a special session would be necessary. State senator Kel Seliger, the chair of the Senate's Select Committee on Redistricting, also downplayed the likelihood that redistricting legislation would be passed but emphasized the importance of creating a "credible instrument for the court to consider." Joe Barton later filed a lawsuit in response to perceived "inaction" by the legislature on redistricting. On May 25, Seliger confirmed that the legislature would not pass redistricting legislation, and that a congressional map would be drawn either by a federal court or in a special session. The same day, Rick Perry reiterated his position that the Legislature rather than the courts should draw the map, and three days later said he would call a special session on the condition that legislators decide on a map in advance.

On May 30, Perry called a special session. On May 31, the first day of the special session, redistricting was added to the list of matters to be addressed and Seliger and Solomons released a proposed congressional map. In Seliger and Solomons' map, African Americans and Hispanic Americans form majorities in two of the new districts, while the other two new districts gave Perry more than 56 per cent of their vote in the 2010 gubernatorial election. The districts represented by Doggett and Republicans Quico Canseco and Blake Farenthold would be made more favorable to Republicans. Democratic state representative Marc Veasey and Nina Perales of the Mexican American Legal Defense and Educational Fund criticized the plan, which they said failed to increase the number of minority opportunity districts. Democratic U.S. Representative Gene Green filed a lawsuit against the map, alleging that it would neglect Hispanic population growth primarily in Harris County. On June 2, Solomons acknowledged that the map was likely to undergo significant changes.

A new map was proposed by Seliger on June 2, under which Republican U.S. Representative Ron Paul's district would be significantly modified and a district which linked urban Houston to rural East Texas counties would be redrawn. The map was passed by the State Senate's redistricting committee, and by the full Senate on party lines on June 6. A slightly different map from that passed by the Senate was passed by the House of Representatives' Redistricting Committee. The House map would lower the Hispanic population of Canseco's district by concentrating Hispanics in Democrat Charlie Gonzalez's district. The map was passed by the full House of Representatives on June 14. On June 20, the Senate voted to accept the House's amendments. The map was signed into law by Perry on July 18.

On September 13, the Civil Rights Division of the U.S. Department of Justice said that, based on a preliminary investigation, the map appeared to have been "adopted, at least in part, for the purpose of diminishing the ability of citizens of the United States, on account of race, color, or membership in a language minority group, to elect their preferred candidates of choice to Congress" and would have a discriminatory effect.

On November 8, a federal court refused to approve the Legislature's proposed map, thereby necessitating lengthy legal proceedings and the implementation of an interim map for the 2012 elections, to be drawn by a panel of federal judges. On November 23, a panel of three federal judges drew a map in which three of the four new districts would favor Democrats. However, three days later Greg Abbott, the Texas Attorney General, announced that the state would file for an emergency stay from the U.S. Supreme Court. On December 9, the Supreme Court blocked the use of the map drawn by federal judges. This was expected to necessitate delaying the state's filing deadline and primary elections.

On January 20, 2012, the Supreme Court rejected the map drawn by the federal court, holding that the court had not paid enough attention to the maps drawn by the legislature, and sent the case back to the lower court.

Overview

District 1
Republican Louie Gohmert, who had represented  since 2005, filed for re-election. He was unopposed in the primary.

Dr. Shirley McKellar, an Army veteran and non-profit businesswoman, was unopposed for the Democratic nomination.

General election results

District 2
Republican Ted Poe, who had represented  since 2005, ran for re-election. He had no challengers in the May Republican primary.

Attorney and CPA Jim Dougherty was the Democratic candidate. There were no other contenders in the primary.

Mark A. Roberts ran as the Green Party Candidate.

General election results

District 3
Republican Sam Johnson, who had represented  since 1991, ran for re-election He was challenged in the Republican primary by Air Force veteran Harry Pierce and by Josh Caesar.

General election results

District 4
Republican Ralph Hall, who had represented  since 1981 (as a Democrat from 1981 to 2004), sought re-election. There was speculation that he might retire due to his age - Hall was 89 years old - and a closer than usual primary in 2010 (though he still won with 57% of the vote). Hall faced two opponents in his party's May primary: businessman and 2010 primary candidate Steve Clark, and businessman Lou Gigliotti. Hall won renomination with 58 percent of the vote; Clark and Gigliotti each received 21 percent.

Attorney VaLinda Hathcox was the Democratic candidate. She had run against Hall in 2010. She was unopposed in the primary.

General election results

District 5
Republican Jeb Hensarling, who had represented  since 2003, ran for re-election and drew no primary opponents.

Legal assistant Linda Mrosko was the Democratic candidate after winning a three-way primary and runoff.

General election results

District 6

Republican Joe Barton, who had represented Texas's 6th congressional district since 1985, ran for re-election in the redrawn 6th district.  He was challenged in the Republican primary by former Addison mayor Joe Chow, Israeli-American security consultant Itamar Gelbman, and accountant Frank Kuchar,.

Manufacturing consultant Kenneth Sanders defeated attorney Brianna Hinojosa-Flores and businessman Don Jaquess to be the Democratic nominee.

Brandon Parmer ran as the Green Party candidate.

General election results

District 7
Democrat James Cargas, an energy lawyer for the City of Houston, ran against Republican incumbent John Culberson

Lance Findley ran as the Green Party Candidate.

General election results

District 8
Republican Kevin Brady, who had represented Texas's 8th congressional district since 1997, ran for re-election. Chris Irish, a health care consultant for Pfizer and founder of the North Houston Tea Party Patriots, and Larry Youngblood, a computer consultant, challenged Brady in the Republican primary. Scott Baker, a businessman, formed an exploratory committee to seek the Republican nomination.

Neil Burns, a former executive at the Shell Oil Company, sought the Democratic nomination.  James Wright, a retiree from New Caney who unsuccessfully challenged Brady as the Democratic nominee in 2004 and 2006, planned to run either as a Democrat or as an independent.

General election results

District 9
Democrat Al Green, who had represented  since 2005, sought a fifth term.

Steve Mueller was the Republican candidate. Neither he nor Green were opposed in their respective primaries.

Vanessa Foster ran as the Green Party candidate.

General election results

District 10
Republican Michael McCaul, who had represented Texas's 10th congressional district since 2005, ran for re-election. He did not seek the open U.S. Senate seat.

Dan Grant, a foreign policy expert, sought the Democratic nomination. Former congressional candidates Larry Joe Doherty and Michael Skelly may also run.

General election results

District 11
Republican Mike Conaway had represented Texas's 11th congressional district since 2005. Wade Brown, a real estate investor, and Chris Younts, an insurance agent and co-founder of the San Angelo Tea Party, challenged Conaway in the Republican primary.

Jim Riley, a businessman, sought the Democratic nomination.

General election results

District 12
Republican Kay Granger, who had represented  since 1997, ran for re-election. She was challenged in the Republican primary by former Highland Village mayor Bill Lawrence.

Retired schoolteacher and veteran Dave Robinson ran unopposed in the Democratic primary.

General election results

District 13
Republican Mac Thornberry, who had represented Texas's 13th congressional district since 1995, sought re-election. Pam Barlow, a veterinarian, also ran.

No Democrats filed; Keith F. Houston ran as the Green Party candidate.

General election results

District 14

Republican Ron Paul, who had represented Texas's 14th congressional district since 1997 and ran for the Republican 2012 presidential nomination, did not seek re-election to the House of Representatives.

State representative Randy Weber won the Republican party nomination over Tim Day, a retired businessman and film-maker; George Harper, a Tea Party activist and civil designer in the petro-chemical industry; John Faulk; John Gay, a former Spring Independent School District administrator; Robert Gonzalez, the chair of the Clear Lake Tea Party; Pearland City Councilmember Felicia Harris; Jay Old, an attorney; and Michael J. Truncale, an attorney and regent of the Texas State University System. Other potential Republican candidates included state representative Dennis Bonnen, former Mayor of Pasadena John Manlove, and former U.S. Representative Steve Stockman. Debra Medina, who unsuccessfully ran for the Republican nomination for Governor of Texas in 2010, decided not to run. State representative Larry Taylor ruled out a bid.

Former U.S. Representative Nick Lampson was the Democratic nominee. He defeated veteran Linda Dailey in the Democratic primary with 83% of the vote.

Zach Grady won the Libertarian party nomination over Eugene Flynn, a lawyer; Amy Jacobellis, a real estate agent; and Bob Smither, an engineering consultant.

Rhett Rosenquest Smith ran as the Green Party nominee.

General election results

District 15
Democrat Rubén Hinojosa had represented Texas's 15th congressional district since 1997. Businessman Dale Brueggemann and Marine Corps veteran Jim Kuiken contested the Republican nomination.

General election results

District 16
Democrat Silvestre Reyes had represented Texas's 16th congressional district since 1997. Former El Paso city council member Beto O'Rourke beat Reyes in the Democratic primary. Barbara Carrasco was the Republican nominee, and Junart Sodoy the Libertarian nominee.

Democratic primary

General election results

District 17

Republican Bill Flores was elected to represent Texas's 17th congressional district in 2011. He ran for reelection, challenged by Libertarian nominee Ben Easton.

General election results

District 18
Democrat Sheila Jackson Lee had represented Texas's 18th congressional district since 1995. She ran for reelection, challenged by Republican nominee Sean Seibert and Libertarian nominee Ben Easton.

General election results

District 19
Republican Representative Randy Neugebauer, considered "the most conservative" of all House members, faces opposition in his primary from Chris Winn, the former Lubbock County GOP chairman.

General election results

District 20
Democrat Charlie Gonzalez, who had represented Texas's 20th congressional district since 1999, retired rather than seek re-election. State representative Joaquín Castro ran unopposed for the Democratic nomination.

David Rosa ran unopposed for the Republican nomination.

Antonio Diaz ran as the Green Party candidate.

General election results

District 21
Republican Lamar S. Smith, represented Texas's 21st congressional district since 1987. Richard Mack, the former sheriff of Graham County, Arizona, and Richard Morgan, a software developer, were defeated in the Republican primary with Smith capturing 77% of the vote . In the election, Smith faced Candace Duval (Dem), John-Henry Liberty (Lib), Fidel Castillo (Grn), Bill Stout (Grn), and Carlos Pena (Ind).

Bill Stout ran as the Green Party candidate.

General election results

District 22
Two-term Republican incumbent Pete Olson sought re-election. He was challenged in the primary by conservative newspaper columnist Barbara Carlson, ultimately winning 76 percent of the vote.

Kesha Rogers, a political activist with ties to the Lyndon LaRouche movement, won the Democratic Party's nomination by 103 votes. Rogers was the party's candidate in 2010 as well, and was disavowed by some local Democrats for her controversial platform, which included impeaching President Obama and colonizing outer space.

Don Cook ran as the Green Party candidate.

General election results

District 23

Republican Quico Canseco was elected to represent Texas's 23rd congressional district in January 2011. John Bustamante, a lawyer and the son of former U.S. Representative Albert Bustamante; and state representative Pete Gallego stood for the Democratic nomination. Engineer Jeffrey C. Blunt filed to run as the Libertarian Party candidate in District 23. Former U.S. Representative Ciro Rodriguez, who represented the 23rd district from 2007 until 2011, had planned to seek the Democratic nomination in the 23rd district; however in November 2011 he announced he would instead run in the new 35th district and later said he would run in whichever district contained his home. Manny Pelaez, an employment law attorney and trustee of VIA Metropolitan Transit who had been considering a bid, did not run. Gallego won the primary run-off against Rodriguez.

Ed Scharf ran as the Green Party nominee.

General election results

District 24
Republican Kenny Marchant, who had represented Texas's 24th congressional district since 2005, ran for re-election.

Grant Stinchfield, a former television reporter for KXAS-TV, challenged Marchant in the Republican primary.

On March 5, 2012, Patrick McGehearty, a computer scientist, dropped out of the Democratic primary to support his wife through a medical problem. McGehearty endorsed Tim Rusk, an attorney from Euless. Rusk ran unopposed in the Democratic primary.

General election results

District 25

Democrat Lloyd Doggett, who had represented Texas's 25th congressional district since 2005, had intended to seek re-election in the new 35th district; however the November 2011 interim map would allow him to instead run in the 25th district.

Ernie Beltz Jr., former federal agency program manager, former business owner, and ex-marine, Bill Burch, the head of the Grass Roots Institute of Texas; Dianne Costa, a former mayor of Highland Village; Dave Garrison, a former Halliburton and USAA executive; Justin Hewlett, the mayor of Cleburne; businessman Brian Matthews; businessman Ralph Pruyn; businessman Wes Riddle; Chad Wilbanks, a former executive director of the Texas Republican Party; and former Railroad Commissioner Michael Williams sought the Republican nomination in the 25th district.  Donna Campbell, an ophthalmologist who unsuccessfully challenged Doggett as the Republican nominee in 2010, and state representatives Jason Isaac and Sid Miller, all of whom had been considering bids, did not run.  Betsy Dewey ran as the Libertarian Party candidate.

General election results

District 26
Republican incumbent Michael Burgess ran unopposed in his party's primary to seek re-election.

He faced Democratic candidate David Sanchez and Libertarian candidate Mark Boler.

General election results

District 27
Republican Blake Farenthold, who was elected to represent Texas's 27th congressional district in January 2011, was to seek re-election in the 27th district or the new 34th district. there was speculation that State representatives Todd Hunter and Raul Torres would challenge Farenthold in the Republican primary.

Rose Meza Harrison, the former chairwoman of the Nueces County Democratic Party, was the Democratic nominee. Filemon Vela, an attorney, ran for a seat to be based in Brownsville, which had been part of the 34th district.

Independent Bret Baldwin and Libertarian Corrie Byrd rounded out the four-candidate field. Baldwin is a conservative Republican from Victoria. He is an international businessman who supports many conservative views. His website showed that he supports limited government, health savings accounts, a balanced budget amendment and restoration of the line-item veto.  Byrd was an assistant manager at a Walmart store and likened his positions to those of retiring representative Ron Paul.

Former U.S. Representative Solomon Ortiz, who represented the 27th district from 1983 until 2011 and lost re-election in 2010, did not run again.

General election results

District 28
Democrat Henry Cuellar was opposed in the November 6 general election by Republican William R. Hayward, an ostrich rancher from San Marcos, and the Libertarian Patrick Hisel, a physician. Hisel ran unsuccessfully as a Libertarian in 2010 against the Republican U.S. Representative Kay Granger of  the Tarrant County-based 12th District. Dr. Hisel's website was not updated and did not list his current city of residence.

Guadalupe County, a Republican stronghold that usually opposed Cuellar for reelection, had been removed from the reconfigured District 28. Cuellar lost four counties and was held to 56 percent of the general election vote in 2010, when he defeated the Republican Bryan Keith Underwood, a carpenter from Seguin, Texas.

Michael D. Cary ran as the Green Party candidate.

General election results

District 29
Maria Selva ran as the Green Party candidate.

General election results

District 30
Democrat Eddie Bernice Johnson had represented Texas's 30th congressional district since 1993. State representative Barbara Mallory Caraway and Taj Clayton, a lawyer, challenged Johnson in the Democratic primary.

General election results

District 31
Republican John R. Carter has represented Texas's 31st congressional district since 2003. Technician Stephen M. Wyman ran as the Democratic candidate. Carter won reelection with 61.28% of votes against Wyman's 34.98%.

General election results

District 32
Republican Pete Sessions had represented Texas's 32nd congressional district since 2002, and had represented district 5 from 1996 to 2002. He sought election to his 13th term in the United States House of Representatives.
Democrat Katherine Savers McGovern challenged Rep. Sessions
Libertarian Seth Hollist was also a candidate, creating a three-way race.

General election results

District 33
Dallas dentist and businessman David Alameel sought the Democratic nomination for the newly created district.  Founder of the National Better Block movement Jason Roberts, David De La Paz, businessman Domingo García, Fort Worth City Council member Kathleen Hicks, and state representative Marc Veasey also sought the Democratic nomination in the new 33rd district. Art Brender, an attorney and former chair of the Tarrant County Democratic Party; and the Rev. Kyev Tatum, a community activist and head of the Tarrant County chapter of the Southern Christian Leadership Conference, also considered a run.

Chuck Bradley, a retiree, and Al Lee, a retired systems consultant, ran for the Republican nomination. Though his hometown of Arlington is contained entirely within the 33rd district, Republican Joe Barton, who had represented the 6th district since 1985, ran again in the 6th district.

During redistricting, Republicans Bill Lawrence, former mayor of Highland Village, former Secretary of State Roger Williams and former Railroad Commissioner Michael L. Williams had all at one point considered running in a district numbered the 33rd. After the district map was finalized, Lawrence ran for the 12th district, and both Williams switched to the 25th.

Ed Lindsay ran as the Green Party candidate.

General election results

District 34
The 34th is a newly numbered district, but most of the pieces came from the district once held by both Solomon Ortiz and Blake Farenthold. It contains all of Cameron, Willacy, Kleberg, Kenedy, Jim Wells, Bee, Goliad and DeWitt Counties, and parts of Gonzales, San Patricio and Hidalgo Counties. It is 73.1% Hispanic by Citizen Voting Population, and voted for President Obama 60–39 in 2008.

Elmo Aycock, former Ortiz Chief of Staff Denise Saenz Blanchard, Former Edinburg City Manager Ramiro Garza Jr., former Rubén Hinojosa district director Salomon Torres, Brownsville City Commissioner Anthony Troiani, businessman and activist Filemon Vela Jr., Cameron County District Attorney Armando Villalobos and attorney Juan Angel Guerra all ran for the Democratic nomination. Vela and Blanchard advanced to the July 31 runoff.

Small business owner Adela Garza, political news commentator Jessica Bradshaw and Paul Harding ran for the Republican nomination. Garza and Bradshaw advanced to the July 31 runoff.

General election results

District 35

Bexar County tax collector Sylvia Romo sought the Democratic nomination in the 35th district. Former U.S. Representative Ciro Rodriguez, who represented the 23rd district from 2007 until 2011, announced in November 2011 that he would seek re-election in the 35th district; however he later said he would run in whichever district contained his home. Richard Perez, a former member of the San Antonio City Council, may also run.

State representative Joaquín Castro had been expected to run in the 35th district; however following Charlie Gonzalez's announcement that he would not seek re-election, Castro announced plans to run in the 20th district. Democratic U.S. Representative Lloyd Doggett, who had represented Texas's 25th congressional district since 2005, had planned to run in the 35th district; however the November 2011 interim map allowed him to instead run in the 25th district.

On the Republican side, Hays County conservative activist Rob Roark and John Yoggerst entered the fray. Susan Narvaiz, the former mayor of San Marcos, also sought the Republican nomination. In the Republican primary election, conducted May 29, 2012, Narvaiz won the primary election and avoided a runoff by obtaining 51.78% of the votes cast.

Meghan Owen ran as the Green Party candidate.

General election results

District 36
Texas's 36th congressional district is one of four new districts, including all or part of Chambers County, Hardin County, Harris County, Jasper County, Liberty County, Newton County, Orange County, Polk County and Tyler County. Ky Griffin, a native of south east Texas, funeral director, and small business owner, Jim Engstrand, a U.S. Army Reserve colonel and small business owner, State senator Mike Jackson contested the Republican nomination. Brian Babin, a dentist who unsuccessfully challenged Jim Turner in 1996 and 1998; Travis Bryan, a precinct chair and former Texas State Guard soldier; and Pasadena mayor John Manlove considered seeking the Republican nomination. State representative James White, also a Republican, had expressed interest, but did not run.

General election results

References

External links
Elections Division at the Texas Secretary of State
Official candidate list
United States House of Representatives elections in Texas, 2012 at Ballotpedia
Texas U.S. House from OurCampaigns.com
Campaign contributions for U.S. Congressional races in Texas from OpenSecrets
Outside spending at the Sunlight Foundation

Texas
2012
House of Representatives